Funplex may refer to:

Funplex, an album by the B-52's
"Funplex" (song), the title track of this album
Fun-Plex, an amusement park in Omaha, Nebraska
The Funplex, an amusement park/center with two locations in Mount Laurel and East Hanover, New Jersey, United States